Sechrist is a surname of German origin, derived from Siegrist. Notable people with the surname include:

Doc Sechrist (1876–1950), American baseball player
Jon Sechrist, American producer and television executive

References

Surnames of German origin